Raymond White may refer to:
Raymond L. White (1943–2018), American geneticist
Raymond Maurice White (1909–1972), English badminton player

See also
Ray White (disambiguation)
Raymond Wilding-White (1922–2001), American composer and artist